Shadrin is a Russian masculine surname, its feminine counterpart is Shadrina. It may refer to:

Aleksandr Shadrin (1988–2014), Uzbekistani football player
Andrei Shadrin (Cossack), Cossack leader in 16th century
Elena Shadrina (born 1982), Russian weightlifter
Nicholas Shadrin, Soviet naval officer and defector
Pavel Shadrin (born 1993), Russian football midfielder 
Tatiana Shadrina (born 1974), Russian chess player
Vladimir Shadrin (1948–2021), Soviet ice hockey player 

Russian-language surnames